Yunli (24 March 1697 – 21 March 1738), born Yinli, formally known as Prince Guo, was a Manchu prince of the Qing dynasty.

Life
Yinli was born in the Aisin Gioro clan as the 17th son of the Kangxi Emperor. His mother was Consort Qin (勤妃), a Han Chinese with the family name Chen.

Yinli excelled in academics since childhood. Unlike most of his brothers, he was never involved in any of the struggles for succession to the throne. He was intelligent and cautious, and had his share of political achievements. He was also good in calligraphy and poetry. He also enjoyed touring the country and had visited almost all the famous mountains in Sichuan.

In 1722, Yinli's fourth brother, Yinzhen, ascended the throne after the death of their father, and became historically known as the Yongzheng Emperor. Yinli changed his name to "Yunli" (允禮) to avoid naming taboo because the Chinese character for "Yin" (胤) in "Yinli" is the same as the one in the Yongzheng Emperor's personal name, Yinzhen (胤禛). In April that year, Yunli was granted the title "Prince Guo of the Second Rank" (多羅果郡王) and placed in charge of administrating the institution of scholars. In 1725, Yunli was awarded a higher allowance for honesty and diligence. In February 1728, he was promoted to "Prince Guo of the First Rank" (果親王). He was later appointed to the Grand Council and given greater responsibilities, such as escorting the Dalai Lama back to Tibet and inspecting military forces stationed along the route. Yunli was known to be a patron and scholar of Tibetan Buddhism.

When the Yongzheng Emperor became seriously ill, Yunli was tasked with supporting the heir to the throne, Hongli. The Yongzheng Emperor died in 1735 and was succeeded by Hongli, who became historically known as the Qianlong Emperor. During the Qianlong Emperor's reign, Yunli was empowered with more authority and given more duties with commensurate recognition.

Yunli died in 1739 at the age of 41. He had two children (a son and a daughter) but both of them died prematurely. His princely title was inherited by Hongyan (弘瞻), the Yongzheng Emperor's sixth son, who was adopted as Yunli's heir.

Family 
Primary Consort

 Imperial Princess Consort Guoyi, of the Niohuru clan Titles: Primary Consort of the Seventeenth Prince (第十七王子福晋), Princess Consort Guo of the Second Rank (果郡王福晋), Imperial Princess Consort Guo of the First Rank (果亲王福晋), Imperial Princess Consort Guoyi of          the First Rank (果毅亲王福晋)

Secondary Consort

 Secondary consort, of the Meng clan (側福晉 孟氏) Titles: Secondary Consort to the Seventeenth Prince (第十七王子侧妃), Secondary Consort to Prince Guo of the Second Rank (果郡王侧妃), Secondary Consort to Prince Guo of the First Rank (果亲王侧妃), Secondary Consort Guoyi of the First Rank (果毅亲王侧妃)
 First son (10 May 1732 – 25 November 1732)
 First daughter (14 January 1735 – 19 July 1735)

Ancestry

In fiction and popular culture
 Portrayed by Li Dongxue in Empresses in the Palace (2011)
 Portrayed by Du Chun in Palace II (2012)

See also
 Prince Guo
 Royal and noble ranks of the Qing dynasty
 Ranks of imperial consorts in China#Qing

References

1697 births
1738 deaths
Manchu politicians
Kangxi Emperor's sons
Qing dynasty politicians from Beijing
Qing dynasty calligraphers
Qing dynasty poets
Artists from Beijing